Syntrophomonas palmitatica is a bacterium. It is anaerobic, syntrophic (in association with methanogens) and fatty acid-oxidizing. Its type strain is GB8-1T (=CGMCC 1.5010T =DSM 15682T). Cells are slightly curved, non-motile rods.

References

Further reading
 Hansen, Kaare H., Birgitte K. Ahring, and Lutgarde Raskin. "Quantification of syntrophic fatty acid-β-oxidizing bacteria in a mesophilic biogas reactor by oligonucleotide probe hybridization." Applied and Environmental Microbiology 65.11 (1999): 4767–4774.
 Staley, James T., et al. "Bergey's manual of systematic bacteriology, vol. 3."Williams and Wilkins, Baltimore, MD (1989): 2250–2251.

External links
 
 LPSN
 Type strain of Syntrophomonas palmitatica at BacDive -  the Bacterial Diversity Metadatabase

Eubacteriales
Gram-positive bacteria
Bacteria described in 2007